The Charcoal Kilns near Eureka, Utah were listed on the National Register of Historic Places in 1979.  The listing included two charcoal kilns that each are about six feet in diameter and four feet deep, built out of stone.  They are believed to have been built or used to support the Wyoming Smelter in 1871.

See also
Beck No. 2 Mine, Eureka, Utah, NRHP-listed
Lime Kilns, Eureka, Utah, NRHP-listed
Soldier Creek Kilns, Stockton, Utah, NRHP-listed
Frisco Charcoal Kilns, Milford, Utah, NRHP-listed

References

Industrial buildings completed in 1871
Industrial buildings and structures on the National Register of Historic Places in Utah
Buildings and structures in Utah County, Utah
Kilns
Charcoal
National Register of Historic Places in Utah County, Utah
1871 establishments in Utah Territory